Weston High School is the name of several public and independent secondary schools in Canada and the United States:

 Weston High School (Connecticut) in Weston, Connecticut
 Weston High School (Louisiana) in unincorporated Jackson Parish, Louisiana
 Weston High School (Massachusetts) in Weston, Massachusetts
 Weston High School (Greenville, Mississippi), in Greenville, Mississippi
 Weston High School (Arlington, Washington)
 Weston High School (West Virginia) in Weston, West Virginia
 Weston High School (Cazenovia, Wisconsin)
 Weston Collegiate Institute, known as Weston High School from 1871 to 1922 in the neighborhood of Weston, York, Toronto, Ontario
 Weston High School in Weston, Oregon, merged to form Weston-McEwen High School of the Athena Weston School District in Athena, Oregon